The Irene Manton Prize of the Linnean Society of London is awarded annually for the "best thesis in botany examined for a doctorate of philosophy during a single academic year" in the United Kingdom.

The prize is named in honour of Irene Manton FRS, the first female president of the Linnean Society of London. She pioneered the biological use of electron microscopy. Her work revealed the structure of the flagellum and cilia, which are central to many systems of cellular motility.

Recipients of the Irene Manton Prize
Sophie Harrington, University of East Anglia (2021)
James Clark (2020)
Leanne Melbourne (2019) University of Bristol; The effect of environmental change on the structure, composition and subsequently the structural integrity of un-attached corallines
Sandy Hetherington (2018) University of Oxford; Evolution and morphology of lycophyte root systems
Shanna Ludwig (2015) University of Bristol; Ecological and evolutionary genetics, focusing on reproductive biology and speciation in diploid and polyploid Sorbus populations 
 Simon Renny-Byfield (2014) Queen Mary, University of London; Evolution of repetitive DNA in angiosperms: Examples from Nicotiana
 Janine Pendleton (2013) University of Sheffield; Carboniferous plants and spores from the Bristol Coalfield
 Alexander S T Papadopulos (2012) Imperial College London;
 Tiina Sarkinen (2011)
 Christopher Thorogood (2010)
 Chris Yesson (2009)
 James Clarkson and Silvia Pressel (2008)
 Lionel Navarro (2007); University of East Anglia; Plant innate immunity and bacterial pathogenesis 
 Yuki Yasumura (2006)
 Alex Wortley (2005)
 Mark Clegg (2003)
 Julie King (2002)
 Alison Gwen Roberts (2001)
 James Edward Richardson (2000)
 Melissa Spielman (1999)
 Alexander Weir (1998)
 Colin Edward Hughes (1997)
 Dorothy Steane (1996)
 Sally Glockling (1995)
 William Justin Goodrich (1993)
 Sharon Anita Robinson and Robert Winning Scotland (1992)
 not awarded (1991)
 Christine Masterson (1990)

See also

 List of biology awards

References

British science and technology awards
Biology awards